Capralba is a comune (municipality) in the Province of Cremona in the Italian region Lombardy, located about  east of Milan and about  northwest of Cremona.

Capralba borders the following municipalities: Campagnola Cremasca, Caravaggio, Casaletto Vaprio, Misano di Gera d'Adda, Pieranica, Quintano, Sergnano, Torlino Vimercati, Vailate.

Transportation 
Capralba has a railway station on the Treviglio–Cremona line.

References

Cities and towns in Lombardy